The 1944 South Australian state election was held on 29 April 1944.

Retiring Members

Labor

 Sydney McHugh, MHA (Light)

Liberal and Country

 David Gordon, MLC (Midland)
 George Ritchie, MLC (Northern)
 John Cowan, MLC (Southern)

Independent

 Joseph Anderson, MLC (Central No.1)

House of Assembly
Sitting members are shown in bold text. Successful candidates are highlighted in the relevant colour. Where there is possible confusion, an asterisk (*) is also used.

Legislative Council
Sitting members are shown in bold text. Successful candidates are highlighted in the relevant colour and identified by an asterisk (*).

References

Candidates for South Australian state elections
1940 elections in Australia
1940s in South Australia